Mahmudabad, (or Mahmoodabad) also known as Mahmudabad Awadh is a town and a municipal board in Sitapur district in the Indian state of Uttar Pradesh.

Mahmudabad tehsil town is the main town in the mandal which has about 66 villages around, while the main city in the district is Sitapur which is about 70 km away and State Headquarter Lucknow is 52 km away. Mahmudabad is approachable by road from all the cities  and towns of Uttar Pradesh, while Lucknow Airport situated about 60 km away is the nearest airport. Mahmudabad having a railway station, besides Munda Gopal Ash, Sidhauli and Ataria Railway stations  are the nearest rail stations which are around 3 to 32 km distance, and some  trains heading to Bihar from Delhi stop at these stations.

History
Mahmudabad Estate was one of the largest feudal estates in the erstwhile kingdom of Awadh. Mahmudabad is the part of Oudh State (अवध रियासत) during British India. Its raja, during the freedom struggle, had been an important member of the Muslim League and a close friend of Jinnah. In 1962, he migrated to Pakistan, leaving his young son and heir behind in Lucknow. The vast Mahmudabad properties in UP were then seized as "enemy property" under defence rules. When the old raja died in London in 1974, his son Raja Mohammad Amir Khan began a long legal battle to get back his inheritance. In a landmark judgement in Sep 2005, the Supreme Court of India directed the Government of India to release the Mahmudabad properties and restore them to the present raja. Raja Mohammad Amir Khan has two sisters who migrated to England with their spouses (also part of the Mahmudabad clan) and children.

Raja Mohammad Amir Khan has two sons Ali Khan Mahmudabad, who is a Professor of History and Political Science at Ashoka University and Amir Khan Mahmudabad.

The novel “The Vanishing Indian Upper Class:Life History of Reza Mohammed Khan” was written by Raja Mohammad Amir Khan’s cousin Rajkumar Mohammad Amir Kazim Khan. A critique on how the upper class of India has transformed since independence of India (4).

Demographics

, Mahmudabad had a population of 41,911. Males constitute 53% of the population and females 47%. Mahmudabad has an average literacy rate of 49%, lower than the national average of 59.5%: male literacy is 54%, and female literacy is 43%. In Mahmudabad, 17% of the population is under 6 years of age.

Education
sardar vallabh bhai patel kanya siksha sansthan
Prakash Vidya Mandir Inter College
BabuRam Savitri Devi Inter College Shekhpur
 United Avadh Inter College
 Adarsh Bal Vidya Mandir 
 Seth M.R. Jaipuria School, Mahmudabad Campus
 Sardar Singh Convent Inter College
 Sita Inter College
 Maulana Azad Institute of Humanities Science and Technology
 Jawahar Lal Nehru Polytechnic
 Moulana Azad Law College
 Seth Ram Gulam Inter and Degree College
 Don Bosco High School
 Calvin College Inter college 
 FAA Government Degree College Mahmudabad
 I T I College
 Mahmoodabad Law College
 Mahmoodabad College of Management & Technology
 Indian Institute of Computer Education
 Universal Computer Education Centre  
 Krishna Institute of Computer Education
BANKING FACILITIES
 State bank of India
Uco Bank 
Allahabad Bank
Punjab National Bank 
HDFC Bank
Oriental Bank of Commerce
Bank of India
Axis Bank 
Allahabad UP Rural Bank

References

4. The Vanishing Indian Upper Class, https://anthempress.com/the-vanishing-indian-upper-class-hb

External links

Cities and towns in Sitapur district